Delias hypomelas is a butterfly in the family Pieridae. It was described by Walter Rothschild and Karl Jordan in 1907. It is endemic to New Guinea.

The wingspan is about 60–64 mm.

Subspecies
D. h. hypomelas (Central Highlands, Papua New Guinea)
D. h. conversa Jordan, [1912] (Mount Goliath, Irian Jaya; Western Province, Papua New Guinea)
D. h. rubrostriata Joicey & Talbot, 1922 (Weyland Mountains, Irian Jaya)
D. h. rawlinsoni Talbot, 1928 (Rawlinson Mountains, Papua New Guinea)
D. h. fulgida Roepke, 1955 (south of Idenburg: central-northern Irian Jaya)
D. h. lieftincki Roepke, 1955 (Ibele Valley, Wamena, Irian Jaya)

References

External links
Delias at Markku Savela's Lepidoptera and Some Other Life Forms

hypomelas
Butterflies described in 1907
Endemic fauna of New Guinea